Piarom is a cultivar of the palm date. It is large, with thin, black-brown skin. It is one of the semi-dry date varieties.

Many Piarom dates are produced in the vicinity of Hajjiabad, Hormozgan in southern Iran.

See also
Mazafati
Mabroom

References

Date cultivars